Sándor Józan (4 August 1932 – 13 May 1985) was a Hungarian state security officer and diplomat, who served as Hungarian Charge d'Affaires ad interim to the United States between 1967 and 1968, after his predecessor, János Radványi applied for asylum from the US government.

References
 Diplomatic Representation for Hungary
 Állambiztonsági Szolgálatok Történeti Levéltára

1932 births
1985 deaths
Hungarian diplomats
Hungarian politicians
Hungarian communists
Ambassadors of Hungary to the United States